The Fourth & Walnut Center (previously known by the names Clopay Building and the First National Bank Building) is a building in Cincinnati, Ohio. It was the tallest in the state from 1904 - 1913. The building was designed by D.H. Burnham and Company and completed in 1904.

The architect Daniel Burnham of Chicago designed the Clopay Building (a combination of the words clothing and paper) in the Chicago school.  The building was listed on the National Register of Historic Places in 2017.

See also
List of tallest buildings in Cincinnati
National Register of Historic Places listings in downtown Cincinnati

References

Buildings and structures completed in 1904
Skyscraper office buildings in Cincinnati
National Register of Historic Places in Cincinnati
Chicago school architecture in Ohio
Cincinnati Local Historic Landmarks
1904 establishments in Ohio